Events in the year 1953 in Turkey.

Parliament
 9th Parliament of Turkey

Incumbents
President – Celal Bayar
Prime Minister – Adnan Menderes
Leader of the opposition – İsmet İnönü

Ruling party and the main opposition
  Ruling party – Democrat Party (DP) 
  Main opposition – Republican People's Party (CHP)

Cabinet
20th government of Turkey

Events
21 January – The first agreement with a US firm about oil exploration in Turkey
25 February – Nonaggression and Friendship Pact signed with Greece and Yugoslavia.
18 March – 1953 Yenice–Gönen earthquake
4 April – TCG Dumlupınar submarine collided with a Swedish freighter and sank (81 deaths)
28/29 May – Heavy casualties of the Turkish brigade during the Battle of the Hook in Korea
18 June – Earthquake around Edirne
16 August – House of the Virgin Mary, close to Ephesus  was opened to visits
10 November – Atatürk’s body was transferred to its final resting place (Anıtkabir) on his death day 
14 December – All property and the furniture of CHP, the main opposition party was confiscated

Births
3 January – Fikri Karadağ, retired colonel
11 January – Mehmet Altan, economist, writer
20 January – Alaattin Çakıcı,  former member of Grey Wolves
23 February – Adnan Polat, business man
1 March – Sinan Çetin, film director and producer
29 March – Güher and Süher Pekinel sisters, pianists
7 April – Fatih Erkoç, singer
4 September – Fatih Terim, footballer, coach

Deaths

28 January – Neyzen Tevfik, ney player and satirist
5 February – Halit Akmansü , retired officier who participated in the Turkish War of Independence
22 September – Necmettin Sadak, former foreign minister
11 December – Sedat Simavi, journalist and founder of Hürriyet newspaper
27 December – Şükrü Saracoğlu, former prime minister (13th and 14th government of Turkey)

Gallery

References

 
Years of the 20th century in Turkey
Turkey
Turkey
Turkey